Rashard Markese Davis (born September 14, 1995) is an American football wide receiver and return specialist for the Memphis Showboats of the United States Football League (USFL). He played college football at James Madison University. Davis has also been a member of the Philadelphia Eagles, Oakland Raiders, Kansas City Chiefs, Tennessee Titans, Saskatchewan Roughriders, Tampa Bay Bandits, and New York Jets.

Early life
Davis attended Charlottesville High School in Charlottesville, Virginia. As a dual threat quarterback, he threw for 1,074 yards and 15 touchdowns completing 61 of 142 attempts and ran for 1,383 yards on 130 rushes and 17 touchdowns his senior year to earn First Team All-District honors as an athlete and Second Team All-District accolades at quarterback. Named the team's MVP after leading Charlottesville its first playoff berth in 10 years. He was named Falcon Club Player of the week on September 19, 2012, for his game against Culpeper, accounting for six scores including four on the ground while racking up 200 yards on nine carries and two passing touchdowns finishing with 122 yards while going 5 for 8. Rashard graduated with Honors from Charlottesville High School in 2012.

College career
Davis played for the James Madison University football team. His first season was in 2013, during which he appeared in 12 games with one start. That season, he tallied 12 receptions for 173 yards. He rushed eight times for 124 yards and a touchdown. Davis set 2 career-bests with a 49-yard run at Delaware (Sept. 28) and a 36-yard touchdown run versus Charlotte (Sept. 21). He also had 8 kick returns for 159 yards and 2 punt returns.

As a sophomore he played in 12 games, posting 21 receptions for 254 yards and two receiving touchdowns. He rushed six times for 22 yards and one score. He recorded career highs of five catches for 123 yards and two touchdowns, including a career-long 76-yard touchdown reception in the win at Lehigh (Sept. 6). He also had six kick returns for 102 yards and three punt returns for 44 yards, including a career-long 32-yard return against UD (Sept. 27). He was named to the CAA All-Academic Team.

As a junior he played in 11 games, making nine starts at slot receiver posting 39 receptions for 592 yards and six touchdowns. Rashard rushed eight times for 48 yards. He made six returns on special teams, taking five kick returns for 102 yard and one punt return for 16 yards. Ranked eighth in CAA with 53.8 receiving yards per game, while also ranking tied for third in receiving touchdowns and fourth in yards per catch (15.2). He set a career-high 125 receiving yards on four receptions at William & Mary (Oct. 31) and tied a career-high of five receptions three times, at SMU (Sept. 26), at Towson (Oct. 10) and at Delaware (Nov. 14). Davis also recorded a season-long, 71-yard reception for a touchdown against Richmond (Oct. 24).

As a senior he played in all 15 games, making 12 starts. He set JMU and CAA single-season record with an FCS-best four punt returns for a touchdown. He had 15 punt returns for a JMU single-season record 426 yards and four scores. He also tallied 42 receptions for 530 yards and three touchdowns and produced a punt return for a touchdown in each of the first two weeks, with a 76-yard touchdown against Morehead State (Sept. 3) and a 75-yard score versus Central Connecticut (Sept. 10). Davis closed the regular season with a 76-yard return for a score against Elon (Nov. 19) and set the program and conference record with a 72-yard return for a touchdown in the FCS quarterfinals versus Sam Houston State (Dec. 9). Had five receptions for 111 yards and a touchdown against Rhode Island (Oct. 29). He tallied five receptions for 57 yards at New Hampshire (Oct. 15) and caught two passes for 53 yards against SHSU. Davis produced three receptions for 52 yards and a touchdown in the NCAA Division I National Championship game versus Youngstown State (Jan. 7). He Had five catches in three games and at least three in nine outings and had four catches over 30 yards, including a season-best 58 yard performance versus Rhode Island. One of two recipients of the Challace McMillin Special Teams Player of the Year.  After the season he was named to the Associated Press All-FCS second-team as an all-purpose player. He was also named CAA Special Teams Player of the Year.

Professional career

Philadelphia Eagles
On August 13, 2017, Davis signed with the Philadelphia Eagles as an undrafted free agent. He was waived on September 1, 2017. He was signed to the practice squad on October 4, 2017, but was released six days later. He was re-signed again on October 19, 2017. He was released on December 14, 2017. He was re-signed on December 27, 2017. While Davis was on the practice squad, the Eagles defeated the New England Patriots in Super Bowl LII, which earned Davis a Super Bowl ring. He signed a reserve/future contract with the Eagles on February 7, 2018. On September 1, 2018, Davis was waived by the Eagles and was signed to the practice squad the next day. He was released on September 7, 2018.

Oakland Raiders
On November 14, 2018, Davis was signed to the Oakland Raiders practice squad. He was released on November 20, 2018. He was re-signed on December 27, 2018. He signed a reserve/future contract with the Raiders on January 1, 2019. He was waived on April 30, 2019.

Kansas City Chiefs
On May 7, 2019, Davis signed with the Kansas City Chiefs. He was waived on August 31, 2019.

On October 15, 2019, Davis was drafted with the first overall pick in the skill players round of the 2020 XFL Draft by the DC Defenders, but did not sign with the league.

Tennessee Titans
On November 5, 2019, Davis was signed to the Tennessee Titans practice squad. He was promoted to the active roster on December 23, 2019. He was waived on September 5, 2020. He was re-signed to their practice squad on December 24, 2020. He was released on January 6, 2021. He was signed to a futures contract by the Titans on January 11, 2021. He was waived on May 17, 2021.

Saskatchewan Roughriders 
On September 16, 2021, Davis agreed to a contract with the Saskatchewan Roughriders of the Canadian Football League (CFL). Davis spent most of his time on the practice roster and was released December 6, 2021.

New York Jets
On July 26, 2022, Davis signed with the New York Jets. He was released on August 16, 2022.

Memphis Showboats
Davis signed with the Memphis Showboats of the USFL on January 11, 2023.

References

External links
 

1995 births
Living people
Players of American football from Virginia
Sportspeople from Charlottesville, Virginia
American football return specialists
American football wide receivers
James Madison Dukes football players
Kansas City Chiefs players
New York Jets players
Oakland Raiders players
Philadelphia Eagles players
Tennessee Titans players
Tampa Bay Bandits (2022) players